(+)-α-Santalene synthase ((2Z,6Z)-farnesyl diphosphate cyclizing) (EC 4.2.3.50, SBS) is an enzyme with systematic name (2Z,6Z)-farnesyl diphosphate lyase (cyclizing; (+)-α-santalene-forming). This enzyme catalyses the following chemical reaction

 (2Z,6Z)-farnesyl diphosphate  (+)-α-santalene + diphosphate

The enzyme synthesizes a mixture of sesquiterpenoids from (2Z,6Z)-farnesyl diphosphate.

References

External links 
 

EC 4.2.3